Sacomã Terminal is a large bus terminal in São Paulo, Brazil. Together with the Mercado, Vila Prudente,  and Cidade Tiradentes Terminals it forms the Expresso Tiradentes, a corridor exclusively used by buses. The Sacomã Metro station is located near the complex.  Before the opening of the terminal, much of the municipal lines (from SPTrans) had a terminus in Parque Dom Pedro II Terminal, in downtown São Paulo.

The station has 3 levels.  
Top floor: Expresso Tiradentes station
Mezzanine: ticketing office, ATMs, cafeteria, operational control center, health and other services. Access to the Sacomã Metro Station is through a walkway.
Ground floor: Access to city buses (platforms 1, 2, 3 and 4) and intercity buses (platforms 5 and 6).

SPTrans